Judith Mary Baragwanath (née Seay; born 7 January 1951) is a New Zealand writer, satirist, fashion critic, fashion muse, model, socialite and maître d’ also known as "Old Black Lips." She rose to prominence in the 1960s as a New Zealand model after appearing in NZ Vogue magazine at the age of 15. She is well-known for her magazine column and feature writing, including contributions (1982–2002) to "Felicity Ferret", a gossip column published in Auckland magazine Metro. New Zealand journalist and writer Steve Braunias has called her "just about, if not the most, concise writer being regularly published that this country has ever seen. One of the most vivid writers we've ever had in non-fiction."

Early life
Baragwanath was born in Birmingham, Alabama to a New Zealand nurse, Vivienne née Grace, and an American GI, Samuel Cleveland Seay. In 1953 the couple separated, and Vivienne returned to her homeland with her baby daughter. Judith Seay was raised in Auckland with no memory of her father. In 1968, aged 17, she married model Tom Baragwanath.

Career
In 1966 Baragwanath was discovered by Auckland fashion photographer Desmond Williams and began working as a model while still at Diocesan School for Girls. She was photographed by New Zealand photographers Williams, Max Thompson, Roger Donaldson, and Michael Baigent (who later became a writer) for fashion magazines including New Zealand Vogue and English magazine Good Housekeeping. She walked the runway during the 1970s and 1980s for New Zealand labels Tigermoth, the New Zealand Wool Board, Vinka Lucas, Blooms, and Patrick Steel.

Baragwanath established herself among Auckland’s creative community, and counted among her close friends a circle of New Zealand artists including painters Pat Hanly, Bill Hammond, and Gavin Chilcott, musicians Graham Brazier and Dave McArtney, writer Hamish Keith, and the Auckland fashion designer Patrick Steel.

In the 1970s she worked as fashion editor for Auckland newspaper the Sunday News and in the 1980s was fashion editor for Auckland paper The Sun. In 1982 she was approached by Warwick Roger to write for his new magazine Metro, as a columnist for a series called “Across Town”. He also wanted her to contribute to an anonymous gossip column called “Felicity Ferret.” This was intended to be both witty and scathing to a degree new to New Zealand readers. It was inspired by the gossip columns of English magazines like Tatler, Private Eye and the Spectator. For years, no-one knew officially who “Felicity Ferret” was, although many suspected Baragwanath’s role. The “Ferret” referred to Baragwanath, when she appeared in the column, as “Old Black Lips” to deter suspicion. It achieved lasting and cult-like status, and was still being analysed more than a decade after it was finally axed in 2002. Although several writers, including Warwick Roger and James Allan, are known to have contributed anonymously to the Ferret, Baragwanath is now understood to have been its foremost writer. She was ideally placed to report on the scandalous behaviour of Auckland’s pre-1987-crash social elite. As well as being a well-connected model and socialite, Baragwanath worked as a waitress and maitre d’ for a series of Auckland restaurants from the 1970s, including The Exchange Hotel, Riccardo's, Clichy, Club Mirage, The French Café, the Verandah Bar and Grill, Tatler and Spectator Bar and restaurant, Café 161, Headquarters, Shanghai Lil’s, Armadillo, and the Alhambra.

A widely reported incident in 1974 did much for Baragwanath’s notoriety – and also her bank balance.  Baragwanath, 23, attended a party at the Rose Gardens in Parnell, Auckland, at which her friend was waitressing. Elton John and his manager, John Reid, were also there. The atmosphere deteriorated after Reid asked for whisky, which wasn’t available. He remonstrated with one of the organisers, events manager Kevin Williams, who offered him a glass of champagne. Reid could not be mollified. “You’re an incompetent!” he is alleged to have shouted, and threw the champagne in William's face. “I lost my temper,” Baragwanath told Metro magazine in 1987.  “I hate injustice and I said to him ‘What the f*** do you think you’re doing, you horrible little man?” “He said “Speak to me like that again and I’ll punch your lights out,” and next minute I was on the floor. Down I went. I had a black eye and was taken home (by my waitress friend) to my horrified mother and grandmother.”  Baragwanath wasn’t Reid’s only victim that evening.  He went on later the same night to become involved in a dispute with Auckland journalist David Wheeler which became physical. The two Sunday News writers (Baragwanath was the paper’s fashion editor) decided to press charges.  Reid’s defence – that he was under extreme pressure and hadn’t slept for nights – did not impress Mr Justice McMullin,  and Reid spent 21 days in Mount Eden jail. He settled out of court with Baragwanath for NZ $2500.  Baragwanath bought her first car with the proceeds. As she never learned to drive, it remains the only car she ever owned.

Baragwanath has worked as a columnist for Auckland newspaper the Sunday Star Times, the New Zealand Listener, and Cuisine magazine. Since 2017 she has been a reviewer and occasional columnist for North & South, Metro magazine and The New Zealand Listener.

Personal life 
Baragwanath married twice; first to  Tom Baragwanath in 1968, and later to restaurant owner Leroy Moody in 1985. For many years she was linked to the New Zealand TV documentary writer and director John Carlaw. Other partners included Auckland television journalist Rhys Jones and musician Johnny Volume. In 1969 her daughter with Baragwanath, Tiffany, was born. Before moving to Australia, Tiffany Baragwanath was a successful New Zealand model and television presenter.

Baragwanath lives on Waiheke Island.

Influence on fashion 
In 2010, New Zealand fashion designer Kate Sylvester paid homage to the “notorious socialite” with a winter collection called "Diamond Dogs" – the nickname given to Baragwanath's social set. Sylvester's models were sent down the runway in gym slips, jodhpur-cut trousers, military jackets, fur coats and black lipstick – the look Baragwanath had long made her own.

Awards 

 2001 Qantas Media Awards – finalist: Magazine Feature Writer.

 2002 Qantas Media Awards – winner: Best Column.

References 

Living people
1951 births
Writers from Birmingham, Alabama
New Zealand columnists
New Zealand women columnists
Gossip columnists
New Zealand socialites
New Zealand female models